Gagan Malik is an Indian actor and Buddhist activist. He won the Best Actor Award in the World Buddhist Film Festival organised by the United Nations for his role as Lord Buddha in Sri Siddhartha Gauthama. Malik is known for his leading role as lord Rama in Ramayan.

Early life and modelling career
Malik was born and brought up in a Jat family in Delhi, India. His father is a businessman from New Delhi, India. He has three elder brothers and a sister. He was educated in Hansraj school Central in Delhi. In his childhood, his mother used to read the epic Ramayana to him. 
When he was young, he used to participate in his colony Ramleela and he have always played the character of Ram in it. Prior to his acting debut, Malik played first class cricket in India. He also played cricket for the Ranji Trophy team in Delhi. After twelve years of cricket he moved to acting.
Malik has vast experience in TV commercials (Times of India, Skoda, Birla Sun Life Insurance), music videos, modeling and designer shows. In 2004, he won Mr. Photogenic in national male beauty pageant Mr India.

Career
In 2005, Malik landed a starring role in Hum Ladkiyan. It tells the story of the young engineer Siddharth, Indian-born engineer, raised and living in the U.S. arrives in Varanasi to work on the Ganga Cleaning Project. The show premiered in Tel Aviv, Israel on 9 September 2005.

He began his acting career in television with Kumkum on Star Plus and then he played a lead role in Zee TV's show Saath Saath Banayenge Ek Aashiyaan, he also appeared in Star One's, TV serial Shakuntala. In 2012, he played the lead role of Ram in Ramayan. The show was immensely popular in Indonesia and hence Malik, together with his co-stars Neha Sargam and Neil Bhatt, were invited to perform in a special stage show in Jakarta organised by antv.

In 2013, Malik debuted in international film "Sri Siddhartha Gautama" as the titular character. "Siddhartha Gauthama" film inspired by the spiritual odyssey of The Buddha has won international awards at the Delhi International Film Festival in India and the United Nations Buddhist Film Festival in Vietnam and broken box office records in Sri Lanka. He won the Best Actor Award in the 2014 World Buddhist Film Festival for his role in "Siddhartha Gauthama".

Malik is part of celebrity cricket team Jaipur Raj Joshiley for Indian sport-reality entertainment show Box Cricket League season 2. Currently he plays the role of Lord Rama in Sankatmochan Mahabali Hanuman in Sony TV.

In 2016, he confirmed that he is "strongly involved" in an international film based on the Buddha. It is reported will be the most expensive movie made on the Buddha. The pre production is on and the team will be shooting the teaser towards July or August.

Personal life

Gagan Malik married his high-school sweetheart, when he was 22. His wife's name is Pooja and they live in Mumbai. Malik said, "I am married and have my Sita with me who is very supportive. Otherwise, I am all sorted and therefore don’t have to worry about any kind of controversies.". Gagan Malik embraced Buddhism in 2014 on Poson Poya day in 2014 in Mihintale, Sri Lanka.

On 10 February 2022, Malik ordained at  Temple in Bangkok, Thailand. His short-termed monkhood will last for 15 days which he would take the opportunity to further study the teachings of Buddhism in Thailand. But he remained a Buddhist monk for 4 months (until June 2022), during which time he visited major Buddhist sites related to the life of the Buddha and the bodhisattva Ambedkar.

Filmography

Film

Television

Theater
2005 Bharati as Siddharth (lead role)

Music videos appearances
Chalte Chalte remix - Music Today
Ang Lag Ja Balam Universal

Charity
In 2013, the idealist actor Gagan Malik, together with Navin Gooneratne who produced "Sri Siddharta Gautama"  film, launched the "Lotus World" project based on the fundamentals of Buddhism by The Light of Asia Foundation, a non-profit organization based in Sri Lanka focused on the advancement of Buddhism throughout the world through audio visual media, to invite likeminded people around the world to the "Lotus Family" to serve humanity. The idea is to form a Family of Members of like thinking based on the Noble Eightfold Path. Three basic principles have been identified.  The first is Goodness – cultivating purity of self through Right Speech, Right Action and Right Livelihood. The second is Friendship – extending the hand of friendship to all who wish to be in the Family of Members and the community at large. The third is Mindfulness – elevating self-awareness through the practice of Mindfulness Meditation resulting in greater clarity and peace of mind .

Gagan Malik considers Emperor Ashoka, who spread the Buddhism in the world, and Dr. Babasaheb Ambedkar, who revived the Buddhism in India, as his role models. He says that the greeting Namo Buddhay (trans: salutations to the Buddha) is never complete without Jai Bhim (trans: salutations to Ambedkar). He stressed that playing the role of Sri Siddharta Gautama had entirely changed his life and his attitude, which is how Lotus World was born. The satisfaction of "doing something for another person" is what has encouraged actor Gagan Malik to give-up the glamorous life style of a film star. As the founder of this project, Malik hopes that children would learn the joy of serving others, books to record their good deeds as a part of the Lotus World's "One good deed a day project" were presented at the launch.

References

External links

 Lotus World by Gagan Malik

Indian male television actors
Living people
Indian male soap opera actors
21st-century Indian male actors
Buddhist activists
21st-century Buddhists
Indian Buddhists
Converts to Buddhism from Hinduism
Indian humanitarians
Year of birth missing (living people)
Buddhist missionaries